Lithuania competed at the 2000 Summer Olympics in Sydney, Australia.

Medalists
Lithuania finished in 33rd position in the final medal rankings, with two gold medals and three bronze medals.

Athletics

Men
Track & road events

Field events

Women
Track & road events

Field events

Combined events – Heptathlon

Basketball

Men's team competition

Preliminary round

Group A

Quarterfinals

Semi-finals

Bronze-medal match

Team Roster
Andrius Giedraitis
Dainius Adomaitis
Darius Maskoliūnas 
Eurelijus Žukauskas 
Gintaras Einikis 
Kęstutis Marčiulionis 
Mindaugas Timinskas 
Darius Songaila 
Ramūnas Šiškauskas 
Šarūnas Jasikevičius 
Saulius Štombergas
Tomas Masiulis

Boxing

Men

Canoeing

Sprint
Men

Cycling

Road
Men

Women

Track
Pursuit

Points

Gymnastics

Artistic

Women

Judo

Men

Modern pentathlon

One male pentathlete represented Lithuania in 1992.

Rowing

Women

Sailing

Open

Shooting

Women

Swimming

Men

Women

Table tennis

Singles

Doubles

Weightlifting

Men

Wrestling

Men's freestyle

Men's Greco-Roman

References

Wallechinsky, David (2004). The Complete Book of the Summer Olympics (Athens 2004 Edition). Toronto, Canada. . 
International Olympic Committee (2001). The Results. Retrieved 12 November 2005.
Sydney Organising Committee for the Olympic Games (2001). Official Report of the XXVII Olympiad Volume 1: Preparing for the Games. Retrieved 20 November 2005.
Sydney Organising Committee for the Olympic Games (2001). Official Report of the XXVII Olympiad Volume 2: Celebrating the Games. Retrieved 20 November 2005.
Sydney Organising Committee for the Olympic Games (2001). The Results. Retrieved 20 November 2005.
International Olympic Committee Web Site
International Olympic Committee Web Site – Lithuania Page. Retrieved 7 January 2010

Nations at the 2000 Summer Olympics
2000 Summer Olympics
2000 in Lithuanian sport